Edward FitzGerald (born July 10, 1968) is an American businessman, attorney, and entrepreneur who previously served as a law enforcement officer and public official in the Greater Cleveland Metropolitan Area.

Early life 
FitzGerald was born in Indianapolis, Indiana on July 10, 1968. FitzGerald was the seventh of eight children, born to Joseph and Mary FitzGerald. FitzGerald graduated from North Central High School in Indianapolis, and then attended Indiana University and Ohio State University, where he earned a degree in political science in 1990. In 1989, FitzGerald moved to the Cleveland, Ohio area, where his father was born and raised, and where the FitzGerald family had lived since emigrating from Ireland in the 19th century. FitzGerald attended the Cleveland-Marshall College of Law, where he received his Juris Doctor degree and passed the Ohio bar exam in 1993.

Public sector career
FitzGerald served as a staff member for U.S. Representative Edward F. Feighan from 1991 to 1992. After graduating from law school, FitzGerald worked as a special agent with the Federal Bureau of Investigation from 1995 through 1998. He was assigned to the Organized Crime Task Force in Chicago, Illinois, and his investigative work focused on political corruption and organized crime influence in Cicero, Illinois. His work helped lead to the indictment and conviction of a number of public officials and members of organized crime.

Also in 1999, FitzGerald was appointed as an At-Large Councilman for the City of Lakewood, Ohio. In November 1999, FitzGerald was elected by the voters to continue in that position and was re-elected in 2001 and 2005.

In 2007, FitzGerald was elected Mayor of Lakewood, Ohio, defeating an incumbent. As mayor, FitzGerald inherited a financial crisis and rising crime rates. After 3 years, FitzGerald was credited for launching successful initiatives in the areas of public safety, fiscal strength, and downtown development.

In 2010 FitzGerald defeated ten other candidates to become the first county executive of Cuyahoga County, which was created in the wake of a major corruption scandal which had engulfed county government.

Tenure as county executive 
As county executive, FitzGerald again inherited a financial crisis which required renegotiating employee contracts and reducing the total number of employees. He also launched policy initiatives in the areas of public safety, downtown development, efficiency, economic development, racial equity, early childhood education, and college affordability. He also managed over a billion dollars in construction projects, including a new convention center, a new county administration headquarters, and a county-owned Hilton Hotel.

2014 Ohio gubernatorial candidacy 
On April 24, 2013, he announced his candidacy for Governor of Ohio.  On May 6, 2014 FitzGerald won the Democratic primary with 83% of the vote.

FitzGerald released a plan for state-funded universal preschool. He criticized Kasich for signing into law income tax cuts that save larger sums of money for wealthier Ohioans than poorer ones, while increasing sales taxes, which tax a larger percentage of income from poorer Ohioans than from wealthier ones. FitzGerald also chided Kasich for a lack of transparency at JobsOhio, the privatized economic development agency that Kasich formed, and for signing into law bills that cut early voting days and limit the distribution of absentee ballot applications.

On November 20, 2013, FitzGerald picked Eric Kearney to be his running mate. On December 10, Kearney stepped down from the ticket due to increasing controversy surrounding back taxes he and his wife owed. FitzGerald later selected Sharen Swartz Neuhardt, an attorney from the Dayton area, to be his running mate.

FitzGerald was defeated by incumbent Republican Gov. John Kasich in the November 4, 2014 election.

Electoral history

*Independent candidate Don Scipione received 11,897 votes (2.89%) and Green Party candidate David Ellison received 6,193 votes (1.5%)

Private sector 
In 2015, FitzGerald formed Great Lakes Economic Development Partners, LLC, which provides economic development consulting services.  In 2017, he formed Pathway Polling, a social media-based public opinion survey firm. In 2018, he also formed Smart City Solar, a firm that provides consulting services for entities considering solar energy array projects.  FitzGerald is also Of Counsel with the Cleveland-based law firm of Walter Haverfield.

Personal life 
In 1991, FitzGerald married Shannon O’Donnell. Together they had four children, Jack, Connor, Colleen and Bridget. FitzGerald is of Irish descent on both his father and mother’s side, with roots in the towns of Westport and Athenry, Republic of Ireland.

References

1968 births
20th-century American lawyers
21st-century American businesspeople
21st-century American lawyers
21st-century American politicians
Candidates in the 2014 United States elections
Cleveland–Marshall College of Law alumni
County executives in Ohio
Federal Bureau of Investigation agents
Living people
Mayors of places in Ohio
Ohio Democrats
Ohio State University alumni
Ohio city council members
Ohio lawyers
Place of birth missing (living people)